Kuma von Clifford (December 15, 2001 – November 21, 2018) was an American dog actor. With a career spanning from 2005 to 2017, the dog appeared in several films and starred as the original title character in the Disney Channel television series Dog with a Blog, as well as the character of Grandma on the Nickelodeon series Mutt & Stuff.

Kuma was a lifelong resident of Southern California, where he was raised by Sarah Clifford. Kuma was a mutt, with Golden Retriever, Husky and Australian Shepherd lineage. Kuma died in late November 2018 as the result of a stroke, shortly before his 17th birthday.

References

2001 animal births
2018 animal deaths
Individual dogs in the United States
Dog actors